Raffles Lighthouse is a lighthouse located on Pulau Satumu in the Singapore Strait, about  south of the main island of Singapore.

History
The Raffles Lighthouse was first mooted in 1833, but the foundation stone was only laid in 1854 when William John Butterworth was the Governor of the Straits Settlements from 1843 to 1855. The stones on which Raffles Lighthouse stands come from the granite quarries on Pulau Ubin. The lighthouse was named after Sir Stamford Raffles, who founded modern Singapore in 1819.

The lighthouse was erected on a  rocky island called Pulau Satumu, the southernmost island off the main island of Singapore. Pulau Satumu means "one tree island" – sa refers to satu ("one") and tumu is the Malay name for the large mangrove tree, Bruguiera confugata. The light source was a wick burner which was replaced in 1905 by a pressurised vapour kerosene mantle burner to increase the light intensity for a greater visible range. A 2nd Order optic was mounted on a roller carriage to allow for smooth rotation. (The Order is a system of classifying the type of lenses used based on the focal length of the lens). This roller carriage was a weight-driven machine which had to be rewound manually to lift the weight whenever it reached the base. The rewinding was done hourly. A crew of seven men was required to man the lighthouse.

In 1968, the installation of a 4th Order electrically operated revolving optic replaced the original 2nd Order optic with a pressurised vapour kerosene "Hood" mantle burner. The power supply came from one of the three generators installed in a generator room built close to the keeper's room. As the rotation was electrically driven by motors, the crew was reduced to four men.

In 1988 the 4th Order optic was replaced by a rotating beacon. This comprised an array of quartz halogen lamps in aluminium parabolic reflectors mounted on a gearless revolving pedestal. The lamps require only one-fifth of the energy required to produce the same intensity as incandescent lamps. These low-power lamps therefore allow solar power to be used in place of generators. In addition, the operation of the light is controlled by a photocell. The manning of the lighthouse was further reduced to two men. The use of solar energy which is freely and readily available has resulted in a reduction of operating and maintenance cost.

Present-day lighthouse
A radar beacon (racon) was also installed at the lighthouse which provides additional navigational information to ships by emitting a Morse code on the ship's radar screen. In 2005, an Aids to Navigation Automatic Identification System (AIS) was installed to broadcast additional positioning information to ships.

Coral reef surveys
The National Parks Board, National Biodiversity Centre, Blue Water Volunteers and volunteers from the public started a coral reef surveying programme in 2005 to monitor the status of hard corals (Scleractinia), mobile invertebrates and coral reef fish at several locations around five southern islands, including Pulau Satumu on which Raffles Lighthouse is located. Internationally recognised techniques developed by Reef Check and the Global Coral Reef Monitoring Network were adopted for this programme.

See also

 List of lighthouses in Singapore
Action of 13 December 1964

References
 
 .

External links

 Raffles Lighthouse on the Lighthouse Depot website (with photograph)
 Raffles Lighthouse on the Singapore Infopedia website
 Satellite image of Raffles Lighthouse and Pulau Satumu on Google Maps
 Singapore on the Amateur Radio Lighthouse Society World List of Lights (WLOL) website

Islands of Singapore
Lighthouses in Singapore
Lighthouses completed in 1855
Western Islands Planning Area
19th-century architecture in Singapore